Damien Thorne is American heavy metal band formed in Chicago, Illinois in 1983.

History 
The band was formed in 1983 in Chicago, Illinois. The band's name was taken from a horror book The Omen. In 1984, the band recorded a demo called Sign of the Jackal, and after that in 1986 released an album with the same name. It was released on the band's own label called "Jackal Productions.

Musical style 
Damien Thorne's musical style has mainly been described as heavy metal, speed metal, and power metal. In an interview, guitarist, Ken Mandate replied as follows:

Band members

Current 
 Warren Halverson – vocals
 Ken Mandat – guitar
 Mick Lucid – bass
 Kevin Tarpey – drums

Former
 Mike Browz – drums
 Rick Browz – bass
 Brian Buxbaum – keyboards

Discography 
 1984 – Sign of the Jackal (Demo)
 1986 – Sign of the Jackal (LP, Roadrunner Records)
 2001 – Wrath of Darkness (LP, None)
 2004 – Wrath of Darkness (Reissue, Criminal Records)
 2005 – Haunted Mind (LP, Jackal Productions
 2011 – End of the Game (LP, None)
 2015 – Soul Stealer (LP, None)

References 

Musical groups established in 1983
American speed metal musical groups
American heavy metal musical groups
American power metal musical groups